Atteva hysginiella is a moth of the  family Attevidae. It is endemic to the Galapagos Islands.

The larvae feed on Castela galapageia.

External links
A review of the New World Atteva (Walker) moths (Yponomeutidae, Attevinae)
Identity of the ailanthus webworm moth (Lepidoptera, Yponomeutidae), a complex of two species: evidence from DNA barcoding, morphology and ecology

Endemic fauna of the Galápagos Islands
Moths of South America
Attevidae
Moths described in 1861